, commonly referred to as APU, is a university in Japan. Ritsumeikan APU was established in April 2000 in Beppu, Ōita, Japan. APU was created through the collaboration of three parties from the public and private sectors: Ōita Prefecture, Beppu City and the Ritsumeikan Trust.

The university has an enrollment of about 5,850, including approximately 2,900 domestic, and 2,900 international students (a 50–50 domestic-international ratio) originating from 90 countries and regions. Half of the 172 full-time faculty members are also foreign nationals who come from more than 30 countries and regions.

Location
The Ritsumeikan Asia Pacific University is located in Beppu, Ōita, on the island of Kyushu in southern Japan.

Background
Ritsumeikan Asia Pacific University is a member of the Ritsumeikan Trust which includes APU, Ritsumeikan University in Kyoto and Lake Biwa and primary, junior and senior high schools throughout Japan. In the early 1990s the concept of creating an international university in the city of Beppu was first raised by the governor of Ōita Prefecture, Morihiko Hiramatsu, with the then chancellor of the Ritsumeikan Trust in Kyoto, Mr Kawamoto. A chief proponent of the concept and design was Professor Makitaro Hotta. The university opened at Jumonjibaru, north of Beppu City in April 2000.

The university was founded on the ideals of "freedom, peace, humanity, international mutual understanding, and the future shape of the Asia-Pacific region." The school's tagline "Shape Your World" was created in 2008 to evoke the image of students coming from all over the world to creating oneself as well as the world.

Campus features

Programs
APU has 3 colleges:
 College of Asia Pacific Studies.
 College of International Management.
 College of Sustainability and Tourism (from Academic Year 2023).

The academic program is offered based on 2 semesters, and each semester is divided into two quarters lasting for seven weeks. In general, most of the classes in APU are carried out on a quarter system. Unlike many other universities in Japan, students are enrolled and graduate twice a year, in spring and fall semester.

APU offers undergraduate studies in subjects including liberal arts such as media studies, language subjects, and Japanese traditional arts. It offers special lecture subjects, which are added to and may change every semester. Students select their own classes and are not restricted to classes in their majors. However, students can only choose classes in their respective curriculum according to their enrollment year, for the curriculum has undergone changes three times since the university was founded.

From academic year 2000 upto 2022, undergraduate programs are conducted in the College of International Management and College of Asia Pacific Studies. The College of International Management (APM) consists of four areas of study: 
 Accounting and Finance (会計・ファイナンス), 
 Marketing (マーケティンク), 
 Strategic Management and Organization (経営戦略と組織), 
 Innovation and Economics (イノベーション・経済学). 

The College of Asia Pacific Studies (APS) has also established four areas of study: 
 Environment & Development (環境・開発), 
 Hospitality & Tourism (観光学), 
 International Relations & Peace Studies (国際関係), 
 Culture, Society & Media (文化・社会・メディア). 
Furthermore, students must complete compulsory language education credits in either English or Japanese.

Specialized post-graduate programs are conducted in the Graduate School of Asia Pacific Studies and Graduate School of Management. The graduate programs are conducted exclusively in English.

Japanese-English bilingual education system
APU practices a bilingual education system in English and Japanese, in a multicultural and multilingual environment in which about half of the teachers are foreign nationals. In the 1st and 2nd year, students will study foundational education in their standard language (English or Japanese) and at the same time work on acquisition of the other language. By the 3rd and 4th years, all students will develop linguistic performance ability to receive specialized education in both Japanese and English. Handouts and notices will be written in both Japanese and English, and guidance will be given in Japanese and English.

CLE (Center For Language Education)

In addition to regular programs in Japanese and English, the Center for Language Education offers six languages of the Asia-Pacific region with a curriculum that is linked to programs such as active learning.

Asia Pacific Language

Six languages in the Asia-Pacific region are offered, from introductory to advanced, in Chinese, Korean, Malay / Indonesian, Spanish, Thai, and Vietnamese. In APU, these are called the "AP languages."

Enrollment
As of 1 November 2016 the university has a total enrollment of around 5,850 students, down from the 2009 figure of 6,162. Currently there are 5,553 students in undergraduate programs, 178 at postgraduate level, and 117 non-degree students. The students are equally distributed between APU's two schools, the College of Asia Pacific Studies (2,786), and the College of International Management (2,731).

While 2,904 of these students are domestic Japanese, 2,944 (about 50.3%) are international students from 90 countries and regions. This ratio is a feature unique to APU amongst Japanese universities; APU is second only to Waseda University in the absolute number of international students enrolled. In terms of country of origin, the majority of international students come from eastern Asia, namely South Korea (499 as of 1 November 2016), Vietnam (476), China (437), Indonesia (346), Thailand (281), and Bangladesh (87).

Facilities

The library provides paper-based as well as electronic media including, academic databases, magazines, newspaper, textbooks, and DVD. Visitors can request media from other Ritsumeikan campuses which will be delivered to the library counter. Recently the library has included other services such as a writing center and meeting spaces for collaborative work.

APU has designated smoking areas around campus and near the student dormitories. The rest of the university is smoke-free. As of 2013, APU will implement a new regulation that aims to make the entire university campus a smoke-free environment.

Intercultural awareness
APU has regular country cultural weeks, which help students to learn more about foreign cultures, for example, Vietnamese Week, Chinese Week, Indian Week, Korean Week, Indonesian Week, Nepali Week, Bangladeshi Week, Taiwanese Week, Sri Lanka Week, Thai Week, Myanmar Week, and Cambodian Week.

Extracurricular activities
There are over 100 student organizations (known as clubs or circles) available at APU, which cover categories of sports, academic research, arts, and social organizations (such as volunteers). Students are free to join clubs they are interested in, and they can create new ones, too. Examples of student organizations include APU Yosshakoi (Japanese traditional dance group), PRENGO (volunteer group), APU Wind Orchestra, Muay Thai (Thai boxing), and Global Business Leader. Since 2015, APU has also been host to the Global Business Case competition.

On-campus housing
The on-campus housing, AP House, offers international students the opportunity to live next to the campus for their first year as they learn the ways and customs of life in Japan. Single and shared rooms are available. AP house provides shared facilities and borrowable items to the residents. Support faculty and staff members are on site, in addition to resident assistants (RA) recruited from the resident student body. RAs play an important role at AP House by supporting residents and promoting interaction and exchange. They also hold some events such as AP House Entrance Ceremony & Welcome Dinner Party and The AP House "World Festival."

Offices
Japan
Tokyo Office
Ritsumeikan Osaka　Campus

Overseas

韓国オフィス　Office of Korea
立命館上海交通大学連絡処　Ritsumeikan Liaison Office located in Shanghai Jiao Tong University
台湾弁事処　Office of Taiwan
インドネシアオフィス　Office of Indonesia
タイオフィス　Office of Thailand
カナダオフィス　Office of Canada
ベトナムオフィス　Office of Vietnam

Notable alumni and faculty

Presidents
Kazuichi Sakamoto (January 2000 – March 2004)
Monte Cassim (April 2004 – December 2009)
Shun Korenaga (January 2010 – December 2017)
Haruaki Deguchi (January 2018–present)

Alumni
Kosuke Enomoto (Kyoto / Kyotanabe City Councilor / April 2019–)
Emil Dardak (Deputy Governor of East Java, Indonesia / February 2019–)
Dissa Ahdanisa (Indonesia, Social Entrepreneur)
Sei Sugama (cubist)
Yuho Hayase (TV Oita Reporter)
Vaughan Allison (Music Promoter)

See also
Ritsumeikan University

References

General
Data found at Japan Student Services Organization site
Ritsumeikan Asia Pacific University homepage
Student handbook 2011 undergraduate academic edition

External links
Ritsumeikan Asia Pacific University
APUPost
APHouse
The APU Times Student Community Newspaper
Student Website "FAFA"

Educational institutions established in 2000
2000 establishments in Japan
Private universities and colleges in Japan
Universities and colleges in Ōita Prefecture
Kyushu region
Beppu, Ōita